Bradshaw is a surname.

The surname Bradshaw was first found in Lancashire at Bradshaw, now part of Greater Manchester. The chapelry of Bradshaw was listed as Bradeshaghe in 1246, meaning "broad wood or copse" (Old English brad + sceaga).

Bradshaw is the surname of the following notable people:

A
Adrian Bradshaw, British military leader
Adrian Bradshaw (photographer), British photographer
Ahmad Bradshaw, American football player
Albert James Bradshaw, Canadian politician
Alexander Bradshaw, British physicist
Alexandra Bradshaw, Canadian-American artist
Allison Bradshaw, American tennis player
Ann Bradshaw (disambiguation), multiple people
Augustine Bradshaw, Benedictine monk

B
Ben Bradshaw, British politician
Benjamin Bradshaw, American wrestler
Bill Bradshaw (rugby league), rugby league footballer of the 1940s
Booker Bradshaw (1941–2003), record producer, film & TV actor, Motown executive
Brent Bradshaw, comedy writer
Brett Bradshaw, American drummer

C
Carl Bradshaw (actor), Jamaican actor
Carl Bradshaw (footballer), footballer
Carrie Bradshaw, fictional character, Sex and the City
Cathryn Bradshaw, British actress
Charlie Bradshaw (disambiguation), multiple people
Chris Bradshaw, Canadian politician
Claudette Bradshaw (born 1949), Canadian politician
Clyde Bradshaw, American basketball player
Constance Bradshaw, British artist
Cooper Bradshaw, fictional character, Guiding Light
Craig Bradshaw, New Zealand basketball player
Craig Bradshaw (American football), American football player

D
Dallas Bradshaw, American baseball player
Daniel Bradshaw (born 1978), Australian rules footballer
Darren Bradshaw (disambiguation), multiple people
David Bradshaw, American artist
Donald Bradshaw, American businessman and mayor
Douglas Bradshaw, Canadian military leader
Dove Bradshaw, American artist
Duncan Bradshaw (born 1986), Zimbabwean-born English cricketer

E
Elias Bradshaw, American politician
Ernest Bradshaw, English footballer
Evans Bradshaw, American jazz pianist

F
Ford Bradshaw, American bank robber
Frank Bradshaw, English footballer
Franklin Bradshaw, American curler
Fred Bradshaw, Canadian politician
Fergal Bradshaw, Gaelic footballer

G
Gareth Bradshaw, Gaelic footballer
Gary Bradshaw, English footballer
Gay A. Bradshaw, American psychologist and ecologist
George Bradshaw (1801–1853), English printer and publisher
George Bradshaw (baseball), American baseball player
George Bradshaw (footballer), English footballer
Gillian Bradshaw, American author
Granville Bradshaw (1887–1969), English aero-engine designer

H
H. Chalton Bradshaw, British architect
Harold E. Bradshaw, American politician
Henry Bradshaw (disambiguation), also Harry, multiple people

I
Ian Bradshaw, West Indian cricketer from Barbados
Ian Bradshaw (photographer), American photographer

J
Jack Bradshaw, English footballer
James Bradshaw (disambiguation), also Jim, multiple people
Joanne Bradshaw, an Australian Paralympic athlete
Joseph Bradshaw (disambiguation), also Joe, multiple people
John Bradshaw (disambiguation), multiple people
John Layfield, ring name "Bradshaw" (born 1966), professional wrestler

K
Keith Bradshaw (disambiguation), multiple people
Ken Bradshaw, professional surfer
Kenrick Bradshaw, Aruban footballer
Kevin Bradshaw, American basketball player

L
Leslie Bradshaw, American businesswoman
Lucretia Bradshaw (fl. 1714 - 1741), English actress 
Lucy Bradshaw, British actress and singer
Lucy Bradshaw (game developer), American video game developer
Luisa Bradshaw-White, English actress

M
Máire Bradshaw (born 1943), poet and publisher
Margaret Bradshaw, New Zealand geologist 
Mark Bradshaw (disambiguation), multiple people
Marquita Bradshaw (born 1974), American environmentalist and former political candidate
Melissa Bradshaw, English musician
Merrill Bradshaw, an American composer and professor
Michael Bradshaw (1933–2001), English stage and film actor
Michael J. Bradshaw, British geographer
Morris Bradshaw, American football player

N
Nigel Bradshaw, British-born actor

P
Paddy Bradshaw, Irish footballer
Paul Bradshaw (disambiguation), multiple people
Peter Bradshaw, British writer
Philippe Bradshaw, British artist
Preston J. Bradshaw, American architect

R
Reggie Bradshaw, Canadian football player
Richard Bradshaw (disambiguation), multiple people
Rita Bradshaw, British romance novelist
Robert Bradshaw (disambiguation), multiple people
Roy Bradshaw (disambiguation), multiple people

S
Sally Bradshaw, English singer
Samuel Carey Bradshaw (1809–1872), U.S. congressman from Pennsylvania
Scott B. Sympathy, real name Scott Bradshaw, Canadian indie rock musician
Sidney Bradshaw Fay, historian
Sonny Bradshaw, Jamaican musician
Steve Bradshaw, American soccer player
Sufe Bradshaw, an American actress
Susan Bradshaw, British pianist

T
Terry Bradshaw (born 1948), American football player
Terry Bradshaw (baseball), American baseball player
Thomas Bradshaw (disambiguation), also Tom or Tommy, multiple people
Tiny Bradshaw (1905–1958), U.S. jazz musician

W
Walter Bradshaw, English cricketer
Wes Bradshaw, American football player and coach
William Bradshaw (disambiguation), also Bill or Billy, multiple people
Wilson G. Bradshaw, president of Florida Gulf Coast University

Fictional characters
The Bradshaws, a fictional family on Piccadilly Radio
 LTJG Nick "Goose" Bradshaw, in Top Gun
 Lt. Bradley "Rooster" Bradshaw, in Top Gun: Maverick

References

English-language surnames